Prakash Bahadur Gurung is a Nepalese politician. He was elected to the Pratinidhi Sabha in the 1999 election on behalf of the Nepali Congress. He represented Constituency 3 of the Kaski District.

References

Living people
Nepali Congress politicians from Gandaki Province
Year of birth missing (living people)
Place of birth missing (living people)
Nepal MPs 1999–2002
Gurung people